= Colonial period of the Philippines =

Colonial period of the Philippines may refer to:

- History of the Philippines (1565–1898) (Spanish colonial period)
- History of the Philippines (1898–1946) (American colonial period)
